Pine Plains National Forest was established in New York by the U.S. Forest Service on April 10, 1925 with  from part of the Pine Plains Military Reservation. On December 2, 1927, the executive order for its creation was rescinded and the forest was abolished. The lands are presently part of Fort Drum.

References

External links
Forest History Society
Forest History Society:Listing of the National Forests of the United States Text from Davis, Richard C., ed. Encyclopedia of American Forest and Conservation History. New York: Macmillan Publishing Company for the Forest History Society, 1983. Vol. II, pp. 743-788.

Former National Forests that were military bases
Protected areas of Jefferson County, New York
Protected areas of Lewis County, New York
Former National Forests of New York (state)